Tom Hudson (born 1994) is a French actor, who starred as 'Jeannot' in the French TV series Résistance.

He is the son of Peter Hudson, a British-born actor who has been based in France since at least 1985.

Filmography 
 2015 : Joséphine, ange gardien : Rémy (1 Episode)
 2013: Délit de fuite: Loïc
 2021: The French Dispatch: Actor Playing Mitch-Mitch

References

Living people
21st-century French male actors
French male television actors
Date of birth missing (living people)
Place of birth missing (living people)
1994 births